Brixia may refer to:
 Brescia, an Italian city referred to in Latin as Brixia
 Brixia (planthopper), an insect genus 
 Brixia Model 35, a mortar 
 521 Brixia, a minor planet orbiting the Sun